Warfare (1957–1971) was an American National Champion Thoroughbred racehorse that broke the track record at New York's Aqueduct Racetrack three times, each at a different distance.

Warfare was bred in California by Clifton H. Jones & Sons. Race conditioned by trainer Haskell "Hack" Ross, in early 1959 Clifton Jones Jr. bought out his family members for $12,000 to become Warfare's sole owner. He raced the son of 1954 Kentucky Derby winner Determine under the nom de course Bellehurst Stable.

Pedigree

References

1957 racehorse births
1971 racehorse deaths
American Champion racehorses
Racehorses bred in California
Racehorses trained in the United States
Horse racing track record setters
Thoroughbred family 4-m